Mitromorpha crenipicta is a species of sea snail, a marine gastropod mollusk in the family Mitromorphidae.

Description
The length of the shell varies between 4 mm and 7 mm.

Distribution
This marine species occurs in the Atlantic Ocean off the Azores and the Canary Islands.

References

 Ávila, S.P.; Cardigos, F.; Santos, R.S. (2004). D. João de Castro Bank, a shallow water hydrothermal-vent in the Azores: checklist of marine Molluscs. Arquipélago (Ciénc. Biol. Mar./Life Mar. Sci.) 21A: 75–80
 Gofas, S.; Le Renard, J.; Bouchet, P. (2001). Mollusca. in: Costello, M.J. et al. (eds), European Register of Marine Species: a check-list of the marine species in Europe and a bibliography of guides to their identification. Patrimoines Naturels. 50: 180–213

External links
 Dautzenberg, Ph. (1889). Contribution à la faune malacologique des Iles Açores. Résultats des Campagnes Scientifiques Accomplies sur son Yacht par Albert Ier Prince Souverain de Monaco, I. Imprimerie de Monaco: Monaco. 112, IV plate

crenipicta
Gastropods described in 1889
Molluscs of the Azores